The Missa Cellensis in honorem Beatissimae Virginis Mariae in C major by Joseph Haydn, Hob. XXII:5, Novello 3, was originally written in 1766, after Haydn was promoted to Kapellmeister at Eszterháza following the death of Gregor Joseph Werner. The original title as it appears on the only surviving fragment of Haydn's autograph score, that has been discovered around 1970 in Budapest, clearly assigns the mass to the pilgrimage cult of Mariazell, Styria. Until that discovery, the work was known as Missa Sanctae Caeciliae, or in German Cäcilienmesse, a title probably attributed to the mass in the 19th century. Whether the alternative title refers to a performance of the piece by the St. Cecilia's Congregation, a Viennese musician's fraternity, on some St. Cecilia's day (22 November), as has been suggested, remains speculation.

It is believed that the original manuscript was lost in the Eisenstadt fire of 1768, and that when Haydn rewrote the piece from memory, he may also have expanded it. It may have originally consisted of only Kyrie and Gloria, with the other parts added later. This Mass was known to Anton Bruckner.

The mass is scored for vocal soloists, SATB choir, 2 oboes, 2 bassoons, 2 trumpets in C, timpani, strings and organ, the latter supplying figured bass for most of the duration.

The setting is divided into six movements.

 Kyrie Adagio (ossia Largo), C major, common time
 "Kyrie eleison" Allegro con spirito, C major, common time
 "Christe eleison" Allegretto, A minor, 3/4
 "Kyrie eleison" Vivace, C major, common time
 Gloria Allegro di molto, C major, 3/4
 "Laudamus te, benedicimus te" Moderato, G major, common time
 "Gratias agimus" Alla breve, E minor, cut time
 "Domine Deus, Rex coelestis" Allegro, C major, 3/8
 "Qui tollis peccata mundi" Adagio, C minor, common time
 "Quoniam tu solus sanctus" Allegro di molto, C major, common time
 "Cum Sancto spiritu" Largo, C major, common time
 "In gloria Dei Patris" Allegro con spirito, C major, common time
 Credo Vivace, C major, common time 
 "Et incarnatus est" Largo, C minor, common time
 "Et resurrexit" Allegro, C major, 3/4 
 Sanctus Adagio, C major, common time 

 Benedictus Andante, C minor, cut time
 "Osanna" Allegro, C major, common time
 Agnus Dei Largo, A minor, common time 
 "Dona nobis pacem" Presto, C major, 3/4

While Jonathan Green finds the choral parts to be of medium difficulty, he finds the orchestral parts quite difficult, and recommends seasoned, "technically secure" players.

Notes

References

 Dack, James (1982). "The Dating of Haydn's Missa Cellensis in honorem Beatissimae Virginis Mariae: An Interim Discussion", Haydn Yearbook 13
 Green, Jonathan D. (2002). A Conductor's Guide to Choral-Orchestral Works, Classical Period: Volume 1: Haydn and Mozart, Scarecrow Press, New York  
 Hugues, Rosemary (1974). Haydn, J. M. Dent & Sons Ltd, London. 
 Larsen, Jens Peter and Feder, Georg (1997). The New Grove Haydn, W. W. Norton & Co., New York 
 Schenbeck, Lawrence (1996). Joseph Haydn and the Classical Choral Tradition, Hinshaw Music, Chapel Hill, North Carolina 
 Sisman, Elaine Rochelle (1997). Haydn and His World, Princeton University Press, Princeton 
 Strimple, Nick (2008). Choral music in the nineteenth century, Hal Leonard, New York

External links 
 
 

Masses by Joseph Haydn
1766 compositions
Compositions in C major